Joseph L. Reid (February 7, 1923 – April 2, 2015) was an American oceanographer. He was professor emeritus of physical oceanography at the Scripps Institution of Oceanography in La Jolla, California.

References

Further reading

1923 births
2015 deaths
Scripps Institution of Oceanography alumni
Scripps Institution of Oceanography faculty
University of California, San Diego faculty
People from Franklin, Texas
American oceanographers